Nuno Miguel Ribeiro de Araujo, a 17-year-old openly homosexual Portuguese boy, was beat to death by two Spaniard youths aged 20 and 22, Sergi Ruiz Lázaro and Domingo López Acedo, in an alley in Escaldes-Engordany, Andorra, in the early morning of April 14, 2000. This crime had a media repercussion in the country because of the brutal violence they exercised and the homophobic motivation of the crime.

The two assailants were sentenced to five and sixteen years respectively by the Tribunal de Corts. On October 24, 2001, the criminal division of the High Court upheld the conviction. In May 2002, the Constitutional Court partially overturned the conviction as it did not consider that it violated the dignity of the person because, at that time, homophobia was not criminalized. Therefore, the sentence of Sergi Ruiz and Domingo Lopez was reduced by one year, and they were convicted only for murder.

This murder motivated the creation of the association Som com Som to start the fight for LGBT rights in Andorra.

References 

April 2000 events in Europe
2000 murders in Europe
2000 in Andorra
Escaldes-Engordany
Violence against LGBT people in Europe
LGBT rights in Andorra
Deaths by beating in Europe
Crime in Andorra
2000 in LGBT history